Ali Bigdeli (born January 21, 1987) is an Iranian football player, who currently plays for  Esteghlal Ahvaz of the Persian Gulf Pro League.

References

Living people
1987 births
Place of birth missing (living people)
Iranian footballers
Association football midfielders
Esteghlal Khuzestan F.C. players
Iranjavan players
Esteghlal Ahvaz players